Independent Natural Resources, Inc. or INRI is an American IP holding company based in Eden Prairie, Minnesota. It formed Renew Blue in Dallas as a wholly owned subsidiary charged with licensing the SEADOG pump.

The SEADOG Pump is an ocean-wave energy technology patented by Independent Natural Resources Inc. (INRI) and invented by Kenneth W. Welch, Jr.

The SEADOG Pump rises and falls with ocean swells, effectively capturing the energy in the ocean waves, to pump seawater to a land-based elevated holding tank.  Once in the tank, the potential energy of the water can be used to drive hydroelectric generators to generate electricity or desalinated water.

The technology was tested in the Gulf of Mexico with results validated by Texas A&M University at Galveston. The SEADOG Pump's manufacturer estimates that "a square-mile field of pumps could generate 50 to 1,500 megawatts of electricity – enough to power thousands of homes – depending on the size and frequency of waves."

The company's technology has been showcased in multiple energy conferences including the Gulf Coast Innovation Conference & Showcase and the Energy and Clean Technology Venture Forum. It also has had features in The Star Tribune, The Houston Business Journal, The Houston Chronicle, and Popular Mechanics.

INRI ceased operations in 2010 and have since gone through bankruptcy and liquidation.

See also
Texas Natural Resources, LLC

References

Wave power
Natural resources organizations